Grandstand for General Staff is a 1932 German comedy film directed by Eugen Thiele and starring Iván Petrovich, Elga Brink, and Betty Bird.

It was shot at the Bavaria Studios in Munich. The film's sets were designed by the art director Ludwig Reiber.

Cast

See also
Grandstand for General Staff (1926)
Grandstand for General Staff (1953)

References

Bibliography

External links 
 

1932 films
1932 comedy films
German comedy films
Films of the Weimar Republic
1930s German-language films
Films directed by Eugen Thiele
German films based on plays
Films set in the 1900s
Films set in Austria
Military humor in film
Remakes of Austrian films
Remakes of German films
Sound film remakes of silent films
Bavaria Film films
Films shot at Bavaria Studios
1930s German films